Hurian (also Romanized as Ḩūrīān) is a village in Dinachal Rural District, Pareh Sar District, Rezvanshahr County, Gilan Province, Iran. At the 2006 census, its population was 1,703, in 410 families.

References 

Populated places in Rezvanshahr County